Joseph John Deacon (24 May 1920 – 3 December 1981) was a British author and television personality.

Biography 
Deacon was born with severe cerebral palsy, a neurological condition that left him with neuromuscular spasticity that particularly affected his arms and legs. Deacon's condition resulted in significant muscular tonus, a tendency for muscular flexion of arms and extension of legs. This virtually prevented fine motor control in his hands, arms and legs. Although Deacon could walk with assistance, he mostly used a wheelchair. Deacon's speech was also unintelligible to most, bar his closest friends.

Deacon was institutionalised as a child and later made shoes in sheltered accommodation. As he was unable to communicate freely, he was mistakenly perceived to be "mentally subnormal" by some peers. However, with the help of his friends Ernie Roberts, Tom Blackburn and Michael Sangster, Deacon was able to write an autobiography, entitled Tongue Tied (1974), which was published by the charity Mencap as part of their Subnormality in the Seventies series. The book provided insight into the lives of those with physical disabilities. With royalties raised from book sales and donations, Deacon and his friends purchased a home that they would be able to reside in.

Early life 
Always believing him to be mentally normal and intelligent, his mother would ask him to count the motor cars passing at the front of their house, to which Joey would respond by blinking for each car that passed. During his childhood in the hospital, he proved his intelligence several times in tests, using non-verbal communication such as blinking or pointing with his nose.

Deacon had some surgical operations on his legs at St Childe's Hospital when he was around four, but these were not successful. At six, his mother died of tuberculosis and Joey was raised by his grandmother. At eight, following several more operations, he was admitted to Queen Mary's Hospital in Carshalton, then transferred six months later to Caterham Mental Hospital (latterly St Lawrence's Hospital), where he remained for the rest of his life. He remained in close contact with his father until his father's death.

Tongue Tied 
In 1970, Deacon began to write his autobiography with three friends. Ernie Roberts, who also had cerebral palsy, had been in hospital since the age of ten and was able to understand Deacon's speech. Roberts listened to Deacon's dictation and repeated it to another patient, Michael Sangster, who wrote it down in longhand. After proof-reading by Chris Ring, a student who visited the team each week, it was typed by a fourth member of the team, Tom Blackburn, who was initially unable to read or write but taught himself to type in order to help. The forty-four page book took fourteen months to write. BBC Radio 4's Woman's Hour ran a feature on Deacon and his manuscript and the resulting publicity led to the BBC TV documentary.

Later life 

The four men formed an inseparable friendship in the hospital for decades, and in 1974 their relationship was the subject of a Prix Italia and BAFTA award-winning drama documentary for British television's Horizon written by Elaine Morgan and directed by Brian Gibson, entitled Joey. This was followed by a second documentary made for Blue Peter.

As soon as Tongue Tied was completed, the team started work on a second book. Deacon wanted to write a work of fiction: a novel about a disabled man who was desperate to learn to walk so that he could walk up the aisle and marry his girlfriend. It was never published.

Royalties from Tongue Tied and donations raised enough money for the four to move to a bungalow on the Caterham hospital grounds in 1979, where they were able to live more independently. After Deacon died two years later at 61, Blackburn and Roberts moved to a house outside the grounds, where they lived with the assistance of support workers.

Blue Peter and cultural impact 

In 1981, during the last year of his life, Deacon was featured on the children's television magazine programme Blue Peter for the International Year of the Disabled. He was presented as an example of a person who had achieved a lot in spite of his disabilities.

Despite the sensitive way in which Blue Peter covered his life, the impact on the public was not entirely as intended. The sights and sounds of Deacon's distinctive speech and mannerisms were picked up on by children and he quickly became a figure of ridicule in school playgrounds across the country, the term "Joey" being used as an insult for a person perceived to be stupid.

Posthumous impact 

In 1982, Deacon's story was the subject of a paper by D. Ellis in the journal Developmental Medicine & Child Neurology, describing how after fifty years' residence in an institution for mentally disabled people, a new strategy was devised by which Deacon's intelligence could be assessed; the strategy revealed that he had normal intelligence.

In 2020, 100 years after Joey Deacon's birth, a charity called the Deacon Centre was established in his home town of Caterham to recognise and continue his legacy. The centre provides 'creativity spaces' for people with mental and communication disabilities in the local area with a programme of activities including creative writing, music, art, and drama.

Bibliography 
 Deacon, Joey (1974). Tongue Tied. Fifty years of friendship in a subnormality hospital, Nat. Soc. for Mentally Handicapped Children, 
 Deacon, Joey (Reprint). Tongue Tied. Fifty years of friendship in a subnormality hospital, Mencap Publications,

References 

1920 births
1981 deaths
20th-century English memoirists
20th-century English male writers
People from Camberwell
People from Caterham
People with cerebral palsy
English people with disabilities
English television personalities
English male non-fiction writers